Malloneta is a monotypic genus of West African jumping spiders containing the single species, Malloneta guineensis. It was first described by Eugène Louis Simon in 1902, and is only found in Africa.

References

Invertebrates of West Africa
Monotypic Salticidae genera
Salticidae
Spiders of Africa